
The following lists events that happened during 1816 in South Africa.

Events

Deaths
 9 March – Cornelius Faber, Hendrik Prinsloo, Theunis de Klerk, and brothers Stefanus and Abraham Bothma are hanged for the Slagter's Nek Rebellion. During the execution, the rope broke and four of the condemned men were forced to wait, amid scenes of much agitation, for some hours before their sentences were carried out.

References

Also see Years in South Africa for list of further References

 
South Africa
Years in South Africa